The Edge of Christmas is a compilation album released in 1995 by Oglio Records. It features Christmas songs with a general new wave/rock theme.

Track listing
 "Thank God It's Christmas" - Queen
 "Please Come Home for Christmas" - Pat Benatar  
 "2000 Miles" - The Pretenders  
 "December Will Be Magic Again" - Kate Bush   
 "Peace on Earth/Little Drummer Boy" - David Bowie and Bing Crosby   
 "Winter Wonderland" - Cocteau Twins   
 "Rudolph the Red-Nosed Reindeer" - The Smithereens   
 "Run Run Rudolph" - Dave Edmunds  
 "Christmas is Coming" - The Payolas  
 "Fairytale of New York" - The Pogues   
 "Merry Christmas (I Don't Want to Fight)" - The Ramones  
 "Christmas Wrapping" - The Waitresses

References 

1995 Christmas albums
1995 compilation albums
Christmas compilation albums
Alternative rock compilation albums
Alternative rock Christmas albums